, formerly known as Fellows!, is a Japanese seinen manga magazine published by Enterbrain. Created in 2008, the magazine was originally called Fellows! and was published with a frequency of publication of two months. In December 2012, Enterbrain announced a revamp on the magazine beginning with its February issue in 2013 with the publication changing its name of Fellows! to Harta and also changing its frequency from bimonthly to ten issues per year from February to August and then October to December. 
The name is inspired by the Indonesian word "Harta", which means "treasure."

Unlike many of the manga magazines in Japan in which the cover features a series currently serialized on the magazine, every issue's cover has an original illustration by different artists.

Serialized titles
A Bride's Story (transferred to Aokishi)

The Coppersmith's Bride (ongoing)
Delicious in Dungeon (ongoing)
Furo Run

Go with the Clouds, North by Northwest (transferred to Aokishi)
Hakumei and Mikochi (ongoing)
Hakuginhi
Haven't You Heard? I'm Sakamoto
Hinamatsuri
Hotel Metsäpeuraan e Yokoso
 (ongoing)
Immortal Hounds
Isabella Bird in Wonderland
Migi to Dali
Ran and the Gray World
Reki Yomi
Shinobuna! Chiyo-chan
Subaru to Suu-san (ongoing)

 (ongoing)
Wanko ni Kuchizuke
Wolfsmund

References

External links
 ハルタ (Harta) 

Magazines established in 2008
2008 establishments in Japan
Seinen manga magazines
Enterbrain manga